The 2012 CFU Club Champions’ Cup was the 14th edition of the CFU Club Championship, the annual international club football competition in the Caribbean region, held amongst clubs whose football associations are affiliated with the Caribbean Football Union (CFU). The top three teams in the tournament qualified for the 2012–13 CONCACAF Champions League.

Participating teams
The following teams were entered into the competition. The four professional teams (in bold) were seeded to directly enter the second round. Per CONCACAF regulations, only the professional teams were eligible to play in the CONCACAF Champions League.

th – Title holders

The following associations did not enter a team:

Anguilla
Aruba
Bahamas
Barbados
British Virgin Islands
Cuba
Dominica
Dominican Republic
French Guiana
Grenada
Guadeloupe
Jamaica
Martinique
Montserrat
Saint Kitts and Nevis
Saint Lucia
Saint Martin
Saint Vincent and the Grenadines
Sint Maarten
Turks and Caicos Islands
United States Virgin Islands

First round
Winner of each group and the best runner-up advanced to the second round.

Group 1
Matches played at the Cayman Islands (host team: Elite).

Group 2
Matches played at Guyana (host team: Alpha United).

Group 3
Matches played at Haiti.

 Centro Barber withdrew.

Best runner-up
To determine the best runner-up, since Groups 1 and 3 have three teams each compared to four for Group 2, the results of the last-place team in Group 2 – Milerock – were voided and the standings recalculated.

Second round
Winner and runner-up of each group advanced to the final round.

Group 4
Matches played at the Cayman Islands (host team: George Town SC).

 Baltimore withdrew after the team was denied visas to the Cayman Islands.

Group 5
Matches played at Trinidad and Tobago (host team: W Connection).

Final round
In the semifinals, the two second-round group winners played against the runners-up from the opposite group. The semifinal winners played in the final while the losers played in the third place match.

Matches played at Trinidad and Tobago.

Semifinals

Third place match

Final

Caledonia AIA, W Connection, and Puerto Rico Islanders qualified for the Group Stage of the 2012–13 CONCACAF Champions League.

Top goalscorers

Source:

References

External links

Caribbean Football Union
Results from CONCACAF

2012
1
2012–13 CONCACAF Champions League